Gloucestershire Airport , formerly Staverton Airport, is a small airport at Churchdown, England. Its operator claims it to be Gloucestershire's largest general aviation airfield, and it is regularly used for private charter flights to destinations such as Jersey and Guernsey.

History 
An airfield was opened in 1931, named after the local village of Down Hatherley; the change of name to Staverton followed relocation to the present site, near Staverton village. The airfield served as a training base for pilots during the Second World War and was known as RAF Staverton. It was later used by Alan Cobham as he developed in-flight refuelling. A pillbox that was part of the British anti-invasion preparations of the Second World War can still be found opposite the main airfield entrance.  With its proximity to Cheltenham, it was also used extensively by the U.S. Army, particularly the Service of Supply under its commanding general, Lt. Gen. John C. H. Lee, who was responsible for all supply and administrative functions of U.S. forces in Britain, beginning in May 1942.

After the war, what is now Smiths Group used the airport as a test site for various aircraft. At the same time the airport provided scheduled services to the Channel Islands, Dublin and Isle of Man. In the 1960s the Skyfame Museum, dedicated to World War II aircraft, opened.

In the 1990s, both the Police Aviation Services and Bond Air Services stationed helicopters and their headquarters at Staverton. In 1993, its name was changed to Gloucestershire Airport in an effort to "reflect its increasing prominence as the business aviation centre for the county".

During the 1990s, Staverton was the home of the MidWest production facility where the company manufactured the MidWest AE series of single- and twin-rotor Wankel aero-engines for light aircraft. The twin-rotor engine was first installed into two ARV Super2 aircraft.  Midwest was eventually closed down, and its assets bought by Austrian manufacturer Diamond Aircraft Industries.

Between 2013 and 2017, Citywing operated scheduled flights from the airport, describing it as "Gloucester (M5) Airport" and marketing it as an alternative to Birmingham Airport, Bristol Airport and to a lesser extent Oxford Airport.

Expansion 
In 2009, the airport was granted planning permission for expansion, first proposed in 2006, which included lengthening a runway. The plans were controversial and proved divisive amongst the local community and authorities.
In March 2015, Gloucestershire Airport announced that it will look to provide more flights, more hangars and more profits in the coming years as part of a new vision for the transport hub. The business plan will see £6million invested in the airport between 2015 and 2025.

Services and facilities 

Many of the flights to and from the airport are for business purposes, but there are also recreational flights and training flights.

The airport houses several flying clubs for private pilots including Bristol Aero Club, Cotswold Aero Club and the Staverton Flying School alongside commercial pilot training from Aeros and Skyborne Aviation.  Specialist helicopter trainers JK Helicopter Training and Heli Air also provide gift/pleasure helicopter flights. People are able to undertake their pilot's licence training at the airport.

Also based at the airport is the Little Jet Company, which has a fleet of Citation Bravo and King Air 350 business jets that can be chartered around Europe.

The airport has a pilot shop, and is also home to The Aviator restaurant and bar. There is a live video camera, aimed on a bearing of 255degrees, just south of due west.

Airlines and destinations 
The majority of Gloucestershire Airport's movements are operated by private aircraft.

Citywing previously flew a minimum of five weekly to the Isle of Man during the winter months and up to 25 times weekly during the summer peak season. The Jersey route was flown three times per month during the peak season between July and September, but was not operated during the winter months. This service ended in March 2017, after the airline was liquidated.

Traffic statistics

Events 
On 14 November 2014, BBC Radio Gloucestershire and its listeners set a new world record for the longest line of cakes, to raise money for Children in Need. Volunteers around the region baked 14,392 cupcakes which were laid in a line at the airport.

References

External links 

 

Transport in Gloucestershire
Airports in South West England